John Easton Mills (October 14, 1796 – November 12, 1847) served briefly as mayor of Montreal, Quebec.

In March 1846, Montreal city council deadlocked on the choice of a mayor.  Mills had ten votes, and incumbent mayor James Ferrier had nine, but Ferrier voted for himself twice, in accordance with existing rules.  Municipal paralysis ensued until December 1846, when Mills was elected decisively.

Typhus outbreak

In 1847 there was a major outbreak of typhus in Montreal among Irish immigrants.  Mills organized measures to contain the epidemic and volunteered to tend to the sick, whereupon he contracted the disease himself and died after less than one year in office.

References

Mayors of Montreal
1796 births
1847 deaths
Canadian businesspeople
Deaths from typhus
Infectious disease deaths in Quebec
People from Hampden County, Massachusetts
Anglophone Quebec people
American emigrants to pre-Confederation Quebec